The 96th District of the Iowa House of Representatives in the state of Iowa.

Current elected officials
Lee Hein is the representative currently representing the district.

Past representatives
The district has previously been represented by:
 Delmont Moffitt, 1971–1973
 Horace Daggett, 1973–1983
 Louis Muhlbauer, 1983–1993
 Sandy Greiner, 1993–2001
 Betty De Boef, 2001–2003
 Cecil Dolecheck, 2003–2013
 Lee Hein, 2013–present

References

096